Robert Harold Siegel (born 18 August 1939 in Oak Park, Illinois; died 20 December 2012 in South Berwick, Maine) was an American poet and novelist. He wrote four books of poetry and five children's novels.

Life and career
Siegel graduated from Wheaton College in 1961, and received an MA in writing from Johns Hopkins University and a PhD in English literature from Harvard University. Siegel was a professor at Dartmouth College, Princeton University, and Goethe University in Frankfurt, Germany, and directed the graduate creative writing program for 23 years at the University of Wisconsin–Milwaukee where he was professor emeritus of English until his death. His poetry has received awards from the National Endowment for the Arts, the Ingram Merrill Foundation, Poetry, Transatlantic Review, and has been nominated twice for The Pushcart Prize for Poetry. His children's fiction includes the award-winning Whalesong trilogy, which has been translated into seven languages.

He lived in Maine, where he died of cancer in December 2012.

List of works
Poetry:
 1973 "The Beasts & The Elders"
 1980 "In a Pig's Eye"
 2005 "The Waters Under the Earth"
 2006 "A Pentecost of Finches: New and Selected Poems"
 2013 "Within This Tree of Bones: New and Selected Poems"

Children's Literature:
 1975 A Tale Whose Time Has Come
 1980 Alpha Centauri
 1981 Whalesong, Crossways Books
 1982  The Kingdom of Wundle
 1994 White Whale
 1994 The Ice at the End of the World

External links 
 Robert Siegel Papers, 1945–1997, Wheaton College Archives & Special Collections

References 

American male poets
American children's writers
1939 births
2012 deaths
Harvard University alumni
20th-century American poets
20th-century American male writers
Johns Hopkins University alumni
Wheaton College (Illinois) alumni
Deaths from cancer in Maine